Ilhéu Laje Branca is an uninhabited islet near the north coast of Maio Island, Cape Verde. It is part of the protected area Parque Natural do Norte da Ilha do Maio, and hosts a colony of white-faced storm petrel.

References

Uninhabited islands of Cape Verde
Geography of Maio, Cape Verde